First National Bank (FNB) is one of South Africa's "big four" banks. It is a division of FirstRand, a large financial services conglomerate, which trades on the Johannesburg Securities Exchange (JSE), under the symbol: FSR.  FNB is also listed on the  Botswana Stock Exchange under the symbol FNBB and is a constituent of the BSE Domestic Company Index.

Overview
FNB is one of the three major divisions of the FirstRand Group, and the others being Rand Merchant Bank and Wesbank. First National Bank maintains banking subsidiaries which it owns wholly or in part, in Botswana, Mozambique, Namibia, South Africa, Eswatini, Tanzania, Zambia, Ghana, India, Lesotho and Guernsey. FNB is also actively pursuing expansion plans in Angola and Nigeria Media reports in May 2012, indicated that the bank is also making plans to expand into Kenya, Rwanda and Uganda.

History
FNB is the oldest bank in South Africa. It traces its origins back to the Eastern triocrees Province Bank, which was formed in Grahamstown in 1838. At that time the bank financed the wool export boom in the district. By 1874, the bank had four branches – at Grahamstown, Middelburg, Cradock and Queenstown. Due to a recession the bank was bought out in 1874 by the Oriental Bank Corporation (OBC). However, as a result of financial difficulties that the Oriental Bank Corporation was experiencing in India, it decided to withdraw from South Africa and thus the Bank of Africa was formed in 1879 to take over the OBC's business in South Africa.

At about the same time, the government of the South African Republic desired to create a local commercial bank, due to the discovery of gold in Barberton and the Witwatersrand. The government thus created a bank through a concession agreement. The task of the bank was to focus primarily on financing agricultural development. A state mint was also established as part of the concession. The Nationale Bank der Zuid-Afrikaansche Republiek Beperk (National Bank of the South African Republic Limited) was registered in Pretoria in 1891 and opened for business on 5 April of the same year. After the conclusion of the Second Anglo-Boer War in 1902, the name of this bank was changed to the National Bank of South Africa Limited.

Due to another recession, the Bank of Africa was bought out by the National Bank in 1912, which had already bought out another bank, the National Bank of the Orange River Colony in 1910. The Natal Bank, which was founded in 1854 to fund the Natal Colony's sugar industry, also suffered financial difficulties and was taken over in 1914. By this time, the National Bank was now one of the strongest and largest banks in South Africa.

However, by the early 1920s, the National Bank was suffering from bad debt and heavy losses. It consequently merged with the Anglo-Egyptian Bank and the Colonial Bank in 1925 to form Barclays Bank (Dominion, Colonial and Overseas). In 1971 Barclays restructured its operation and its South Africa operation was renamed Barclays National Bank Limited.

Due to a disinvestment campaign against South Africa because of its apartheid policies, Barclays was forced to reduce its shareholding and sold its shareholding in the bank in 1986. The bank was renamed "First National Bank of Southern Africa Limited" in 1987 and became a wholly South African owned and controlled entity.

In 1998, the financial services interests (which included their shareholding in First National Bank) of Rand Merchant Bank Holdings and Anglo-American Corporation were merged to form FirstRand, which is listed on the JSE Securities Exchange. In consequence, FNB became a wholly owned subsidiary of FirstRand Limited; it currently trades as a division of FirstRand Bank Limited.

In 1999, the First National Bank was mentioned in the 'Ciex Report' that summarised a two-year long investigation into the theft of R26 billion from the state during the apartheid era. The investigators claimed that FNB unlawfully received hundreds of millions of Rands from the SARB. The money was disguised as 'lifeboats' for covering bad loans. True to 2017 the stolen funds have yet to be recovered.

FirstRand Group
The FirstRand Group was established in 1998, by the merger of First National Bank of South Africa, Rand Merchant Bank and Momentum Insurance & Asset Management. FirstRand is listed as a "locally controlled bank" by the South African Reserve Bank, the national banking regulator. , the group had total assets valued at US$90.3+ billion (ZAR:698 billion) (2011) with subsidiaries in seven sub-Saharan countries and in Australia and India. Expansion plans in another six African countries are underway.

Controversies

Safety deposit box victims 
During September 2015 it was reported in the Sunday Times that FNB stated "a small number" of safety deposit boxes where stolen from the Sunnyside branch in Pretoria.

Later in the same year, 360 boxes were stolen in a daring overnight break-in at the Randburg, Johannesburg branch.

On New Year's Eve, the third and final break-in occurred at the FNB Parktown branch. It was reported at the time that the value was approximately R1.7 Million out of 30 deposit boxes in the branch.

In 2018, reports surfaced that 60 victims were going ahead with a damages claim against First National Bank (South Africa) reported to amount to R121 Million.

See also

FirstRand
Wesbank
Absa Bank Limited
Standard Bank
List of banks in South Africa
Economy of South Africa

References

External links

Official FNB website
Website of FirstRand Limited

Banks of South Africa
Companies based in Johannesburg
Banks established in 1838
1838 establishments in the Cape Colony
FirstRand